Evergestis placens is a moth in the family Crambidae. It was described by Francis Walker in 1866. It is found on Borneo.

References

Evergestis
Moths described in 1866
Moths of Borneo